Epicocconone is a long Stokes' shift fluorogenic natural product found in the fungus Epicoccum nigrum.  Though weakly fluorescent in water (green emission, 520 nm)  it reacts covalently yet reversibly with primary amines such as those in proteins to yield a product with a strong orange-red emission (610 nm). Epicoconone is notable because it the first covalent/reversible/turn-on fluorophore to be discovered and is a natural product with a new fluorescent scaffold. It is also cell membrane permeable, unlike many other fluorophores, and subsequently can be used in in vivo (live cell) applications. Additionally, this dye can be used as a sensitive total protein stain for 1D and 2D electrophoresis, quantitative determination of protein concentration, making it a powerful loading control for Western blots.

Synthetic variant 
In addition to the natural variant from the fungus, there are several synthetic analogs. With respect to protein staining properties there are few differences between natural and synthetic analogs.

Reaction

References

Fluorescent dyes